Victoria Dunn (born 13 August 1977) is a British judoka. She competed in the women's extra-lightweight event at the 2000 Summer Olympics. She is a three times champion of Great Britain, winning the extra-lightweight division at the British Judo Championships in 1997 and the half-lightweight division in 2002 and 2003.

References

External links
 

1977 births
Living people
British female judoka
Olympic judoka of Great Britain
Judoka at the 2000 Summer Olympics
People from Greenwich
20th-century British women